Sir Michael O'Loghlen, 1st Baronet (6 October 1789 – 28 September 1842) was a distinguished Irish judge and politician.

He was born at Port Ruan, Ennis, County Clare, the third son of Colman O'Loghlen and his second wife, Susannah Finucane, daughter of Dr. Michael Finucane. The O’Loghlens were descended from the princes of Corcomroe, in the Burren. He was educated in Trinity College Dublin and was called to the Irish Bar in 1811. Through sheer hard work, he gained a reputation as an outstanding pleader.

In 1817 he married Bidelia Kelly l, daughter of Daniel Kelly from Dublin. They had four sons, Colman, Hugh, Bryan and Michael and four daughters, Maria, Susan, Bidelia and Lucy.

In 1815 Sir Michael was junior counsel to Daniel O’Connell, whose friendship was of great assistance to him. In 1834 he became Solicitor-General for Ireland and was elected MP for Dungarvan from 1835 to 1837. He brought in the O'Loghlen Act for the Suppression of Drunkenness, which cleared the way for Fr. Mathew's temperance movement. In 1835 became Attorney-General for Ireland and was elevated to the Irish Bench as Baron of the Court of Exchequer (Ireland) in 1836, the first Roman Catholic to occupy a seat on the Bench since 1688. He relinquished this office the following year on being appointed Master of the Rolls in Ireland. In July 1838 he was created a Baronet, of Drumcanora in Ennis.

O'Loghlen died in London. He is buried in the family vault at the old graveyard in Ruan. His mausoleum is an impressive Egyptian Revival tomb. A statue of Sir Michael O’Loghlen can be seen at the Ennis Courthouse. He was succeeded as baronet by his eldest son Colman, and on Colman's death by his younger son Bryan, Premier of Victoria.

References

External links
 Clare County Library, Sir Michael O'Loghlen, (1789–1842)
 
 

1789 births
1842 deaths
Baronets in the Baronetage of the United Kingdom
Members of the Parliament of the United Kingdom for County Waterford constituencies (1801–1922)
Politicians from County Clare
UK MPs 1835–1837
Irish barristers
Solicitors-General for Ireland
Attorneys-General for Ireland
Members of the Privy Council of Ireland
Masters of the Rolls in Ireland
Serjeants-at-law (Ireland)